The 58th Vaughan's Rifles (Frontier Force) was an infantry regiment of the British Indian Army. It was raised in 1849 as the 5th Regiment of Punjab Infantry. It was designated as the 58th Vaughan's Rifles (Frontier Force) in 1903 and became 5th Battalion 13th Frontier Force Rifles in 1922. In 1947, it was allocated to the Pakistan Army, where it continues to exist as 10th Battalion The Frontier Force Regiment.

Early history
The regiment was raised on 18 May 1849 by Captain JE Gastrell at Leiah as part of the Transfrontier Brigade. In 1851, the brigade was expanded and redesignated as the Punjab Irregular Force, which later became famous as the Punjab Frontier Force or The Piffers. The Piffers consisted of five regiments of cavalry, eleven regiments of infantry and five batteries of artillery besides the Corps of Guides. Their mission was to maintain order on the Punjab Frontier; a task they performed with great aplomb. The 5th Punjab Infantry took part in numerous frontier operations besides the Great Indian Mutiny of 1857–58, when it operated in Oudh and Nepal. During the Second Afghan War of 1878–80, the regiment fought in the Battle of Peiwar Kotal and took part in the defence of Sherpur Cantonment at Kabul. In 1897, it took part in the Tirah Campaign.

58th Vaughan's Rifles (Frontier Force)
Subsequent to the reforms brought about in the Indian Army by Lord Kitchener in 1903, the regiment's designation was changed to 58th Vaughan's Rifles (Frontier Force). In 1914, the regiment's class composition was three companies each of Pathans and Sikhs, and one company each of Dogras and Punjabi Muslims. During the First World War, the regiment served on the Western Front in 1914–15, fighting in the Battles of Givenchy-les-la-Bassee, Neuve Chapelle, Aubers Ridge and Loos. In 1915, it served in Egypt moving to Palestine in 1917, where it fought in the Third Battle of Gaza, the Battle of Nebi Samwil and the Capture of Jerusalem. In 1918, it fought in the Battle of Megiddo, which led to the annihilation of Turkish Army in Palestine.

Subsequent History
After the First World War, the 58th Vaughan's Rifles (Frontier Force) was grouped with the 55th, 57th, 59th, and the two battalions of 56th Punjabi Rifles (Frontier Force) to form the 13th Frontier Force Rifles in 1922. The 58th Vaughan's Rifles became 5th Battalion of the new regiment. During the Second World War, the battalion served in Iraq, Iran, Lebanon, North Africa and Italy. In 1947, the Frontier Force Rifles was allotted to Pakistan Army. In 1948, 5 FF Rifles fought in the Kashmir War against India. In 1956, the Frontier Force Rifles and the Pathan Regiment were merged with the Frontier Force Regiment, and 5 FF Rifles was redesignated as 10 FF. During the Indo-Pakistan War of 1965, the battalion fought in the Battle of Khem Karan in the Kasur Sector.

Genealogy
1849 5th Regiment of Punjab Infantry
1851 5th Regiment of Infantry, Punjab Irregular Force
1865 5th Regiment of Infantry, Punjab Frontier Force
1901 5th Punjab Infantry
1903 58th Vaughan's Rifles (Frontier Force)
1922 5th Battalion (Vaughan's) 13th Frontier Force Rifles
1945 5th Battalion (Vaughan's) The Frontier Force Rifles
1956 10th Battalion The Frontier Force Regiment

References

Further reading
 The Historical Record of the 5th Punjab Infantry, Punjab Frontier Force. (1887). Lahore: Punjab Government Press.
 
 Condon, Brig WEH. (1953). The Frontier Force Rifles. Aldershot: Gale & Polden.
 Young, Brig WHH. (1945). Regimental History of the 13th Frontier Force Rifles. Rawalpindi: The Frontier Exchange Press.
 North, REFG. (1934). The Punjab Frontier Force: A Brief Record of Their Services 1846–1924. DI Khan: Commercial Steam Press.
 Hayauddin, Maj Gen M. (1950). One Hundred Glorious Years: A History of the Punjab Frontier Force, 1849–1949. Lahore: Civil and Military Gazette Press.
 Dey, RSBN. (1905). A Brief Account of the Late Punjab Frontier Force, From its Organization in 1849 to its Re-distribution on 31st March 1903. Calcutta.
 Attiqur Rahman, Lt Gen M. (1980). The Wardens of the Marches – A History of the Piffers 1947–71. Lahore: Wajidalis.
 Khan, Maj Muhammad Nawaz. (1996). The Glorious Piffers 1843–1995. Abbottabad: The Frontier Force Regimental Centre.
 Gaylor, John. (1991). Sons of John Company: The Indian and Pakistan Armies 1903– 1991. Stroud: Spellmount. 
Barthorp, M, and Burn, J. (1979). Indian Infantry Regiments 1860–1914. London: Osprey. 
Sumner, Ian. (2001). The Indian Army 1914–1947. London: Osprey. 
Lind, AG (1933) 58th Rifles Indian... – 1919 AG Lind.pdf  1933

See also
The Frontier Force Regiment
13th Frontier Force Rifles
Punjab Irregular Force

British Indian Army infantry regiments
Frontier Force Regiment
Military units and formations established in 1849
1849 establishments in British India